Richland County is a county in the U.S. state of Wisconsin. As of the 2020 census, the population was 17,304. Its county seat is Richland Center. The county was created from the Wisconsin Territory in 1842 and organized in 1850. It is named for the high quality of its soil.

Geography

Major highways

  U.S. Highway 14
  Highway 56 (Wisconsin)
  Highway 58 (Wisconsin)
  Highway 60 (Wisconsin)
  Highway 80 (Wisconsin)
  Highway 130 (Wisconsin)
  Highway 131 (Wisconsin)
  Highway 154 (Wisconsin)
  Highway 171 (Wisconsin)
  Highway 193 (Wisconsin)

Airport
Richland Airport (93C) serves the county and surrounding communities.

Adjacent counties
 Vernon County – north
 Sauk County – east
 Iowa County – southeast
 Grant County – southwest
 Crawford County – west

Demographics

2020 census
As of the 2020 census , the population was 17,304. The racial makeup of the county was 93.4% White, 0.6% Black or African American, 0.6% Asian, 0.3% Native American, 1.2% from other races, and 4.0% from two or more races. Ethnically, the population was 3.0% Hispanic or Latino of any race.

2000 census

As of the census of 2000, there were 17,924 people, 7,118 households, and 4,833 families residing in the county. The population density was 31 people per square mile (12/km2). There were 8,164 housing units at an average density of 14 per square mile (5/km2). The racial makeup of the county was 98.39% White, 0.15% Black or African American, 0.26% Native American, 0.21% Asian, 0.03% Pacific Islander, 0.28% from other races, and 0.68% from two or more races. 0.93% of the population were Hispanic or Latino of any race. 37.7% were of German, 12.5% Norwegian, 10.3% Irish, 9.5% English and 8.8% American ancestry. 97.1% spoke English, 1.1% German, and 1.1% Spanish as their first language.

There were 7,118 households, out of which 30.50% had children under the age of 18 living with them, 56.30% were married couples living together, 7.70% had a female householder with no husband present, and 32.10% were non-families. 27.20% of all households were made up of individuals, and 13.40% had someone living alone who was 65 years of age or older.  The average household size was 2.48 and the average family size was 3.01.

In the county, the population was spread out, with 25.20% under the age of 18, 8.40% from 18 to 24, 25.50% from 25 to 44, 23.70% from 45 to 64, and 17.20% who were 65 years of age or older. The median age was 39 years. For every 100 females there were 98.20 males. For every 100 females age 18 and over, there were 94.90 males.

Communities

City
 Richland Center (county seat)

Villages
 Boaz
 Cazenovia (partly in Sauk County)
 Lone Rock
 Viola (partly in Vernon County)
 Yuba

Towns

 Akan
 Bloom
 Buena Vista
 Dayton
 Eagle
 Forest
 Henrietta
 Ithaca
 Marshall
 Orion
 Richland
 Richwood
 Rockbridge
 Sylvan
 Westford
 Willow

Census-designated places
 Gotham
 Sextonville

Unincorporated communities

 Ash Ridge
 Aubrey
 Balmoral
 Basswood
 Bear Valley
 Bloom City
 Bosstown
 Buck Creek
 Bunker Hill
 Byrds Creek
 Eagle Corners
 Excelsior
 Five Points
 Germantown
 Gillingham
 Hub City
 Ithaca
 Jimtown
 Keyesville
 Loyd
 Neptune
 Nevels Corners
 Orion
 Port Andrew
 Rockbridge
 Sabin
 Sand Prairie
 Sylvan
 Tavera
 Tunnelville (partial)
 Twin Bluffs
 West Lima
 Westport
 Wild Rose
 Woodstock

Ghost towns/neighborhoods
 Ashford
 Corwin
 Henrietta
 McGrew
 Mill Creek

Politics

See also
 COVID-19 trends for Richland County
 National Register of Historic Places listings in Richland County, Wisconsin

Notes

References

Further reading
 History of Crawford and Richland Counties, Wisconsin. Springfield, Ill.: Union Publishing, 1884.
 Miner, James H. (ed.) History of Richland County, Wisconsin. Madison, Wis.: Western Historical Association, 1906.

External links
 Richland County website
 Richland County map from the Wisconsin Department of Transportation
 Richland County Health and Demographic Data

 
1850 establishments in Wisconsin
Populated places established in 1850